Jeremy Boyce Rotevall (born August 28, 1993) is a Swedish professional ice hockey player who is currently playing for Timrå IK in the Swedish Hockey League (SHL).

International play
Boyce first competed with Sweden at the junior international level at the 2010 World Under-17 Hockey Challenge claiming the Bronze Medal.	He later made his way through the junior ranks with Sweden at the 2011 IIHF World U18 Championships, finishing with the Silver Medal. He then made two appearances with Sweden at the World Junior Championships in 2012 and 2013, collecting a Gold and Silver respectively.

References

External links

1993 births
Living people
Swedish ice hockey forwards
Timrå IK players
Ice hockey people from Stockholm